Hulhimendhoo as a place name may refer to:
 Hulhimendhoo (Gaafu Alif Atoll) (Republic of Maldives)
 Hulhimendhoo (Laamu Atoll) (Republic of Maldives)